Elizabeth Wallfisch (née Hunt; born 28 January 1952) is an Australian Baroque violinist.

Biography
Born in Melbourne, Wallfisch debuted as a concert soloist at the age of 12 and took part in such competitions as the ABC Concerto Competition. She was educated at St Catherine's School, Toorak in Melbourne, leaving in 1969. She studied at the Royal Academy of Music under Frederick Grinke and was awarded, among other prizes, the President's Prize. At the age of 20 she won the Franco Gulli Senior Prize for violin, and was jointly awarded the Mozart Memorial Prize.

In 1974, Wallfisch won the prize for most outstanding performance of Johann Sebastian Bach in the Carl Flesch Competition.  She began to perform with orchestras such as the London Mozart Players and the Royal Liverpool Philharmonic Orchestra in England, establishing herself as a concert performer in the UK.

She developed a reputation as a specialist Baroque violinist. Playing on a period instrument, Wallfisch has recorded and performed many Baroque works, well-known and obscure, from Vivaldi's The Four Seasons to a collection of Telemann's Violin Concertos (6 CDs, CPO) to the Pietro Locatelli Violin Concertos, Op. 3.

In 1989, she co-founded The Locatelli Trio (since renamed Convivium), along with Richard Tunnicliffe (cello) and Paul Nicholson (harpsichord). This ensemble records and performs less well-known works from the Baroque, including violin sonatas by Locatelli, Corelli and Tartini.

Wallfisch has led many diverse ensembles and orchestras around the world; these include the Orchestra of the Age of Enlightenment, the Hanover Band and the Raglan Baroque Players. In her home country of Australia, she has led such ensembles as the Australian Chamber Orchestra and the Australian Brandenburg Orchestra.

Academic positions, past and present, held by Wallfisch include Professor of Baroque Violin at the Royal Conservatoire in The Hague, teaching at the Royal Academy of Music in London, and artist-in-residence at the University of Melbourne.

Personal life
Wallfisch is married to the British cellist Raphael Wallfisch. Their three children are producer of film scores and Academy-member Benjamin Wallfisch, cellist and baritone Simon Wallfisch, and singer-songwriter Joanna Wallfisch. Elizabeth Wallfisch is the granddaughter of the British conductor Albert Coates, daughter of British oboist Tamara Coates, twin sister of the late Australian-Canadian cellist Tanya Prochazka, and  step-daughter of cellist Marianne Hunt.

Accolades
In 2021 she received the Telemann Prize by the city of Magdeburg.

References

External links 
 Hyperion Records: Elizabeth Wallfisch
 Goldberg Magazine: Elizabeth Wallfisch

1952 births
20th-century classical violinists
Australian classical violinists
Australian performers of early music
Women performers of early music
Living people
Baroque-violin players
Alumni of the Royal Academy of Music
21st-century classical violinists
20th-century Australian musicians
21st-century Australian musicians
Women classical violinists
20th-century women musicians
21st-century women musicians
People educated at St Catherine's School, Melbourne
Musicians from Melbourne